Kurud is a town and a nagar panchayat in Dhamtari District in the Indian state of Chhattisgarh.

Geography
It has an average elevation of 298 metres (977 feet). It is situated on the national highway 30 and nearly 53 km away from state capital Raipur. Kurud is one of the greatest mandi (market) where paddy is being sold by farmers.

Demographics
 India census, Kurud had a population of 11,469. Males constitute 50% of the population and females 50%. Kurud has an average literacy rate of 64%, higher than the national average of 59.5%: male literacy is 73%, and female literacy is 56%. In Kurud, 16% of the population are under 6 years of age.

References

Cities and towns in Dhamtari district